Oreanthes is a genus of flowering plants belonging to the family Ericaceae.

Its native range is Ecuador.

Species
Species:

Oreanthes buxifolius 
Oreanthes ecuadorensis 
Oreanthes fragilis 
Oreanthes glandulifer 
Oreanthes hypogaeus 
Oreanthes rotundifolius 
Oreanthes sperlingii

References

Ericaceae
Ericaceae genera